The Cappelen Prize is a Norwegian literary award that was established in 1979 by the publishing company J.W. Cappelens Forlag, on the occasion of the 150th anniversary of the publishing house. It has not been awarded after J.W. Cappelens Forlag merged with N. W. Damm & Søn to Cappelen Damm in 2007.

Laureates
1979 – Thorbjørn Egner
1980 – Odd Eidem
1981 – Hans Normann Dahl and Vivian Zahl Olsen
1982 – Bjørg Vik and Jahn Otto Johansen
1983 – Richard Herrmann, Otto Øgrim, Helmut Ormestad and Kåre Lunde
1984 – Lars Saabye Christensen, Ove Røsbak, Rune Belsvik and Karin Sveen
1985 – Kolbein Falkeid and Arvid Hanssen
1986 – Inger Margrethe Gaarder and Fredrik Skagen
1987 – Roy Jacobsen and Håvard Rem
1988 – Ingvar Ambjørnsen
1989 – Vigdis Hjorth
1990 – Kjell Arild Pollestad and Hans-Wilhelm Steinfeld
1991 – Paal-Helge Haugen
1992 – Axel Jensen
1993 – Erik Bye and Tor Bomann-Larsen
1994 – No award
1995 – No award
1996 – Gert Nygårdshaug
1997 – Erlend Loe
1998 – No award
1999 – Georg Johannesen
2000 – Gro Dahle
2001 – Anne Holt
2002 – Jan Jakob Tønseth
2003 – Karin Fossum
2004 – Pedro Carmona-Alvarez, Ingeborg Arvola, Ørnulf Hodne, Anne-Lise Gjerdrum
2005 – No award
2006 – Erik Fosnes Hansen and Torbjørn Færøvik
2007 – Discontinued.

References

Norwegian literary awards
Awards established in 1979
Awards disestablished in 2007
1979 establishments in Norway
2007 disestablishments in Norway